Warszawa Rakowiec railway station is a railway station in the Ochota district of Warsaw, Poland. It is served by Koleje Mazowieckie, who run services from Warszawa Wschodnia to Góra Kalwaria or Skarżysko-Kamienna.

References
Station article at kolej.one.pl

External links

Rakowiec
Railway stations served by Koleje Mazowieckie
Ochota